Bill Lloyd may refer to:

Sportspeople
 Bill Lloyd (basketball) (1915–1972), American professional basketball player
 Bill Lloyd (footballer) (1896–1950), Australian rules footballer
 Bill Lloyd (racing driver), racing driver in 1954 World Sportscar Championship etc.
 Bill Lloyd (soccer), American men's national team soccer coach
 Bill Lloyd (tennis) (born 1949), Australian tennis player

Musicians
 Bill Lloyd (rock musician), member of the alternative rock band Placebo
 Bill Lloyd (country musician), member of the country music duo Foster & Lloyd; also a member of the country music group The Sky Kings

See also
 William Lloyd (disambiguation)